Lynx spider (Oxyopidae) is a family of araneomorph spiders first described by Tamerlan Thorell in 1870. Most species make little use of webs, instead spending their lives as hunting spiders on plants. Many species frequent flowers in particular, ambushing pollinators, much as crab spiders do. They tend to tolerate members of their own species more than most spiders do, and at least one species has been identified as exhibiting social behaviour.

Description 
There are several genera of Oxyopidae and they differ in their habits and adaptations. Most of them have large spiny bristles on their legs and in many species the bristles form almost a basket-like structure that may assist in confining the prey that they grasp, and protect the spider from its struggles. Most Oxyopes and Hamataliwa species are small to medium in size. Lynx spiders, in spite of being largely ambush hunters, are very speedy runners and leapers, alert and with good vision. Oxyopidae in general rely on keen eyesight in stalking, chasing, or ambushing prey, and also in avoiding enemies.

Identification 
As with many other families of spiders, the arrangement of their eyes is typical of the family and is an important aid in identifying them as members of the family. Six of the eight eyes of Oxyopid spiders are arranged in a hexagon-like pattern, more or less on a prominent hump on the front upper corner of the prosoma. The other two eyes are smaller, less conspicuous, and generally are situated in front of and below the other six. The basal parts of the chelicerae of most species are large, vertical and parallel, which combine with the bluff front end, a "high forehead" to the prosoma, to give most species a peculiar "flat-faced" appearance.

Hunting 
They tend to be drab ambush hunters, depending to some extent on the season, some occupy flowers, ambushing pollinating insects. In this they resemble the crab spiders (Thomisidae) in behaviour. Others crouch in wait, camouflaged on plant stalks or bark. Peucetia species on the other hand, commonly are larger. They are rangy and their camouflage is vivid green, adapted to hunting or hiding among foliage.

Behavior 
Except when defending egg purses, many tend to flee rapidly when approached by predators or large creatures such as humans. They tend not to be very aggressive towards other members of their own species, and sometimes meet casually in small groups. Possibly as an extreme example, at least one member of the genus Tapinillus is remarkable as being one of the few social spiders, living in colonies with communal feeding, cooperative brood care, and generational overlap. Peucetia viridans is unusual among spiders in that females defending their egg purses will spray or "spit" venom at intruders, including humans.

Benefits 
Some members of the genus Oxyopes are abundant enough to be important in agricultural systems as biological control agents. This is especially true of the striped lynx spider (Oxyopes salticus). Their net value in agriculture has been disputed however, on the grounds of their predation of pollinators.

Genera

Genera common in the United States include common lynx spiders and green lynx spiders. , the World Spider Catalog accepts the following genera:

Hamadruas Deeleman-Reinhold, 2009 — Asia
Hamataliwa Keyserling, 1887 — South America, North America, Central America, Asia, Australia, Africa, Caribbean
Hostus Simon, 1898 — Madagascar
Oxyopes Latreille, 1804 — Africa, North America, South America, Oceania, Asia, Central America, Caribbean, Italy
Peucetia Thorell, 1869 — Asia, Australia, Europe, South America, Africa, United States, Panama
Pseudohostus Rainbow, 1915 — Australia
Schaenicoscelis Simon, 1898 — Brazil, Guyana
Tapinillus Simon, 1898 — Brazil
Tapponia Simon, 1885 — Malaysia, Indonesia

Gallery

See also
 List of Oxyopidae species

References

External links

Lynx Spider large format photographs